Multiplaza is a chain of shopping malls, owned by Grupo Roble of El Salvador (the real estate subsidiary of Grupo Poma), in Central America.

Background
The first Multiplaza mall opened in Tegucigalpa, Honduras in 1990 as part of the expansion plan Grupo Roble.  Additional Multiplaza locations opened in San Pedro Sula, Honduras, in 1995,  Costa Rica (in Escazú in 1993), and Panama (in Ciudad de Panamá in 2004). After several years, Grupo Roble decided to create another chain of malls similar to Metrocentro CC.

The most ambitious project of Grupo Roble a city within a city was built (in the first phase) in 2004 Panamericana Multiplaza located in San Salvador, El Salvador, which has the commercial centers and a tower of luxury apartments. Multiplaza Panamericana is the biggest Multiplaza, and it will also hold the two tallest buildings in Central America (excluding Panama).

In 2009, the Multiplaza Panamá, designed by Ricardo Legorreta, was awarded the gold medal in the category Development and Design by the International Council of Shopping Centers.

The first H&M store to open in Panama was in September 2021 at a Multiplaza mall.

Locations

References

External links

Shopping malls in Colombia
Shopping malls in Costa Rica
Shopping malls in Ecuador
Shopping malls in El Salvador
Shopping malls in Honduras
Shopping malls in Mexico
Shopping malls in Venezuela
Ricardo Legorreta buildings